Wickham was an electoral district of the Legislative Assembly in the Australian state of New South Wales and named after the Newcastle suburb of Wickham. It was created in 1894, when multi-member districts were abolished, and the three member district of Newcastle was divided between Wickham, Newcastle East, Newcastle West, Kahibah and Waratah. The first member was John Fegan who was one of the members for Newcastle. It was abolished in 1920, with the introduction of proportional representation and combined with Newcastle. The sitting member William Grahame unsuccessfully stood as an independent at the 1920 election for Newcastle.

Members for Wickham

Election results

References

Former electoral districts of New South Wales
Constituencies established in 1894
1894 establishments in Australia
Constituencies disestablished in 1920
1920 disestablishments in Australia